El Clásico Paisa is the name for the rivalry between the teams of Atlético Nacional and Independiente Medellín. They share the Atanasio Girardot stadium, with a capacity of over 40,000, infamous for its aggressive background. Commonly, the two teams are among the most successful teams in Categoría Primera A, with Atlético Nacional among the most successful in Colombia by domestic and international titles, compared to Independiente Medellín.

History
El Clásico Paisa is mainly dominated by Atlético Nacional, who has won 125 matches in the league, while Independiente Medellín has 84. They have tied in 96 matches. The first match between the two was played on September 12, 1948 with a 3–0 victory of Independiente Medellín. The top goalscorer of the derby is Víctor Aristizábal, who has scored 19 goals for Atlético Nacional. The matches with the most goals scored are: Nacional 7–2 (July 4, 1959); Nacional 6–0 Medellín (November 4, 1976); Medellín 5–1 (April 28, 1979); Medellín 1–6 Nacional (December 9, 1987).

Statistics

Head-to-head

Honours

Results

References 

Colombian football rivalries
Independiente Medellín
Atlético Nacional
1948 establishments in Colombia